Dorian Electra Fridkin Gomberg (born 1992) is an American singer, songwriter, and performance artist. Their debut studio album, Flamboyant, was released in 2019, followed by their second  studio album, My Agenda, in 2020. Electra is known for their non-conforming fashion, queer aesthetics, and experimental pop sound. Electra identifies as genderfluid.

Early life
Electra's father is Paul Gomberg, known as "the Rockstar Realtor" in Houston, originally from Beverly Hills. Their mother is artist and jewelry designer Paula Fridkin. Electra graduated from School of the Woods, a Montessori high school in Houston, Texas. They attended Shimer College, a Great Books school in Chicago, Illinois, from 2010 to 2014.

Career
Electra first drew national attention in 2010 with the music video "I'm in Love with Friedrich Hayek", which lauded the philosophy of the Austrian economist Friedrich Hayek and garnered commentary from the modern Austrian theory professor Steven Horwitz.

In 2011, they released two more videos, "Roll with the Flow" and "We Got it 4 Cheap". Both were covered by mainstream political media. "We Got it 4 Cheap" came in second in the Lloyd V. Hackley Endowment's "Supply and Demand Video Contest".

In 2012, they interned at production company Emergent Order.  Emergent Order had previously published "Fear the Boom and Bust", a similar Hayek-oriented rap video.

Electra then produced a new, similarly economics-oriented pop video, "FA$T CA$H", with the support of an award from the Moving Picture Institute.

In September 2012, Electra released the music video "Party Milk", which they describe as an attempt to merge common party scene symbolism with something one would never associate with a party, but that everyone is familiar with in another context.

In 2014, Electra (as Dorian Electra & The Electrodes) released a music video called "What Mary Didn't Know", based on Frank Jackson's philosophical thought experiment of the same name (1986).

2015 saw the release of Electra's video "Forever Young: A Love Song to Ray Kurzweil", a tribute to the futurist Ray Kurzweil.
In 2016, Electra released "Ode to the Clitoris" on Refinery29 detailing the history of the clitoris from ancient Greece to modern 3D models. In an interview Electra stated it was to "desensitize people to the word CLITORIS and help bring it more into popular consciousness." In June 2016 Electra released "Mind Body Problem" on Bullett Media, a song and video "about femininity as a performance—when being a 'woman' feels like putting on a costume and the costume doesn't seem to come off with the clothes".

Electra continued their music video series with Refinery29 about intersectional feminism and queer histories with "The History of Vibrators" (2016), the "Dark History of High Heels" (2016), "2000 Years of Drag" (2016), and "Control" (2017). These videos focused on the histories of intersectional feminist and queer issues, collaborating with many artists including Imp Queen, London Jade, The Vixen, Lucy Stoole, Eva Young, Zuri Marley, K Rizz, and Chynna. "2000 Years of Drag" was accepted and screened at The East Village Queer Film Festival, NewFest, Fringe! Queer Film & Arts Fest, TWIST: Seattle Queer Film Festival, Austin Gay & Lesbian International Film Festival (aGLIFF), Art All Night - Trenton: 6th Annual Film Festival, Desperado LGBT Film Festival, QUEER-Streifen Regensburg, Filmfest homochrom, Flatpack Film Festival, CINEMQ.

In 2017, Electra released the single Jackpot through Grindr's digital publication Into More, a song that "addresses gender fluidity, but in a more subtle, less explicitly educational way." Later that year, Electra was featured on the Charli XCX track "Femmebot" with Mykki Blanco on the mixtape Pop 2.

In 2018, Electra released three new tracks titled "Career Boy", "VIP", and "Man to Man".

In 2019, Electra released their debut album, Flamboyant. In August 2019, Electra embarked on the Flamboyant: Chapter I tour, which lasted until November 2019. They began the second leg, Flamboyant: Chapter II, in early 2020. However, in March of the same year, the rest of the tour dates were postponed due to COVID-19.

In 2020, Electra released the single "Thirsty (For Love)", a collaboration with fans. They also released a deluxe version of "Flamboyant" later that year. Following this, they released the singles "Sorry Bro (I Love You)", "Give Great Thanks", "Gentleman", and "M'Lady". On September 21, 2020, Electra announced their project My Agenda, featuring appearances from Rebecca Black, Sega Bodega, Lil Mariko, Mood Killer, Faris Badwan, Pussy Riot, Village People, and Dylan Brady among others. The project was released on October 16, 2020, and is described as exploring "crisis in masculinity".

Personal life
Electra is queer and genderfluid, and uses they/them pronouns. They have been diagnosed with attention deficit disorder. Electra is Jewish.

Discography

Albums

Studio albums

Instrumental albums

Demo albums

Singles

As lead artist

As a featured artist

Other charted songs

Other appearances

Videos
 "I'm in Love with Friedrich Hayek" (2010)
 "Roll with the Flow" (2011)
 "We Got It 4 Cheap" (2011)
 "Party Milk"
 "Fast Ca$h" (2012)
 "What Mary Didn't Know" (2015)
 "Forever Young: A Love Song To Ray Kurzweil" (2015)
 "Ode to the Clitoris" (2016)
 "Mind Body Problem" (2016)
 "The History of Vibrators" (2016)
 "Dark History of High Heels" (2016)
 "2000 Years of Drag" (2016)
 "Control" (2017)
 "Jackpot" (2017)
 "Career Boy" (2018)
 "V.I.P." (feat. K Rizz) (2018) 
 "Man to Man" (2018)
 "Flamboyant" (2019)
 "Daddy Like" (2019)
 "Adam & Steve" (2019)
 "Guyliner" (2020)
 "Malibu" (Guest appearance) (2020)
 "Sorry Bro (I Love You)" (2020)
 "Give Great Thanks" (2020)
 "Gentleman / M'Lady" (2020)
 "Edgelord" (feat. Rebecca Black) (2020)
 "F the World" (2020)
 "Friday (Remix)" (Guest appearance) (2021)
 "Shape of You"  (2021)
 "Positions"  (2021)
 "Ram It Down" (feat. Mood Killer, Lil Mariko & Lil Texas) (2021)
 "Feels Like We Only Go Backwards"  (2021)
 "Happy"  (feat. 645AR) (2021)
 "My Agenda" (feat. Village People & Pussy Riot) (2021)
 "My Agenda" (Anamanaguchi Remix) (feat. Village People & Pussy Riot) (2022)

References

External links
 

1992 births
Living people
Musicians from Houston
Shimer College alumni
Singer-songwriters from Texas
21st-century American singers
Non-binary singers
Non-binary songwriters
American LGBT singers
American LGBT songwriters
Queer singers
Queer songwriters
Transgender Jews
Jewish American musicians
Electropop musicians
Experimental pop musicians
Baroque pop musicians
Transgender non-binary people
LGBT people from Texas
Transgender singers
Transgender songwriters
21st-century American Jews
21st-century LGBT people
Genderfluid people
American transgender writers
American non-binary writers
Hyperpop musicians